Porte-de-Seine is a commune in the department of Eure, northern France. The municipality was established on 1 January 2018 by merger of the former communes of Porte-Joie (the seat) and Tournedos-sur-Seine.

See also 
Communes of the Eure department

References 

Communes of Eure